Pseudonympha cyclops, the cyclops brown, is a butterfly in the family Nymphalidae. It is found in Zimbabwe and Mozambique. The habitat consists of grassy slopes.

References

Satyrini
Butterflies described in 1955